"Don't You Want My Love" is a 1985/1986 hit song by Nicole McCloud under her mononym Nicole. The song was written by Aldo Nova and became a hit in several European countries and charted on the Billboard dance chart (#10) and R&B chart (#66) in the US.

The song appeared on the soundtrack to the 1986 film Ruthless People.

The "Maxi Club version" of the single went on to become an international dance hit for her charting in Belgium, France, Germany, the Netherlands and Sweden.

Track listing
The US release
A1: "Don't You Want My Love" (club mix) (5:00)
B1: "Don't You Want My Love" (dub mix) (6:12)

UK release
A1: "Don't You Want My Love" (club mix) (5:00)
B1: "Don't You Want My Love" (dub mix) (6:12)
B2: "Shy Boy" (4:04)

2002 remix
In her 2002 album So What, she released a remix version mixed by Larry "Ford" Fordyce and titled "Don't You Want My Love (2002)".

Charts

Weekly charts

Year-end charts

References

1986 singles
1985 songs
Songs written by Aldo Nova